Reform Bloc (Kutla Al-Islah) was a candidature list that contested the May 2005 municipal elections in Bethlehem, the West Bank. The list was launched by Hamas. In total, the Bloc presented 7 candidates. The top candidate of the Bloc was Hassan al-Masalman.

References

External links
Candidate List 
Election Programme 
Bethlehem municipal election blocs
Defunct political party alliances in the Palestinian territories
Hamas